Haran Kaveri is a Malaysian film director and screenwriter, most known as the writer, director and executive producer of Snap (2014).

Early life and background
Haran was born and brought up in Kuantan, Pahang, Malaysia. He grew up in a middle-class family. His father is in the air force and his mother, a Tamil teacher. He attended SAE Institute for Sound Engineering program but failed to complete.

Career
His shorts have travelled to several festivals. His debut shorties Snap premiered at 48Hours and won National winner in 2014, Won Best film, Best Actor, Best Editing and Best Music.

Filmography as director

Awards
 He won the Best Director Award for Snap at 48Hours, and also Best Film, Best Actor, Best Editing and Best Music.

External links
  

1989 births
Living people
Malaysian film directors
Malaysian film producers
Malaysian people of Indian descent
Malaysian screenwriters
People from Penang